Electromagnetic mass was initially a concept of classical mechanics, denoting as to how much the electromagnetic field, or the self-energy, is contributing to the mass of charged particles. It was first derived by J. J. Thomson in 1881 and was for some time also considered as a dynamical explanation of inertial mass per se. Today, the relation of mass, momentum, velocity, and all forms of energy – including electromagnetic energy – is analyzed on the basis of Albert Einstein's special relativity and mass–energy equivalence. As to the cause of mass of elementary particles, the Higgs mechanism in the framework of the relativistic Standard Model is currently used. However, some problems concerning the electromagnetic mass and self-energy of charged particles are still studied.

Charged particles

Rest mass and energy 
It was recognized by J. J. Thomson in 1881 that a charged sphere moving in a space filled with a medium of a specific inductive capacity (the electromagnetic aether of James Clerk Maxwell), is harder to set in motion than an uncharged body. (Similar considerations were already made by George Gabriel Stokes (1843) with respect to hydrodynamics, who showed that the inertia of a body moving in an incompressible perfect fluid is increased.) So due to this self-induction effect, electrostatic energy behaves as having some sort of momentum and "apparent" electromagnetic mass, which can increase the ordinary mechanical mass of the bodies, or in more modern terms, the increase should arise from their electromagnetic self-energy. This idea was worked out in more detail by Oliver Heaviside (1889), Thomson (1893), George Frederick Charles Searle (1897), Max Abraham (1902), Hendrik Lorentz (1892, 1904), and was directly applied to the electron by using the Abraham–Lorentz force. Now, the electrostatic energy  and mass  of an electron at rest was calculated to be 

Thus the formula for this electromagnetic energy–mass relation is

This was discussed in connection with the proposal of the electrical origin of matter, so Wilhelm Wien (1900), and Max Abraham (1902), came to the conclusion that the total mass of the bodies is identical to its electromagnetic mass. Wien stated, that if it is assumed that gravitation is an electromagnetic effect too, then there has to be a proportionality between electromagnetic energy, inertial mass, and gravitational mass. When one body attracts another one, the electromagnetic energy store of gravitation is according to Wien diminished by the amount (where  is the attracted mass,  the gravitational constant,  the distance):

Henri Poincaré in 1906 argued that when mass is in fact the product of the electromagnetic field in the aether – implying that no "real" mass exists – and because matter is inseparably connected with mass, then also matter doesn't exist at all and electrons are only concavities in the aether.

Mass and speed

Thomson and Searle
Thomson (1893) noticed that electromagnetic momentum and energy of charged bodies, and therefore their masses, depend on the speed of the bodies as well. He wrote:

In 1897, Searle gave a more precise formula for the electromagnetic energy of charged sphere in motion:

and like Thomson he concluded:

Longitudinal and transverse mass

From Searle's formula, Walter Kaufmann (1901) and Max Abraham (1902) derived the formula for the electromagnetic mass of moving bodies:

However, it was shown by Abraham (1902), that this value is only valid in the longitudinal direction ("longitudinal mass"), i.e., that the electromagnetic mass also depends on the direction of the moving bodies with respect to the aether. Thus Abraham also derived the "transverse mass":

On the other hand, already in 1899 Lorentz assumed that the electrons undergo length contraction in the line of motion, which leads to results for the acceleration of moving electrons that differ from those given by Abraham. Lorentz expanded his 1899 ideas in his famous 1904 paper, where he set the factor  to unity, thus:

,

So, eventually Lorentz arrived at the same conclusion as Thomson in 1893: no body can reach the speed of light because the mass becomes infinitely large at this velocity.

Additionally, a third electron model was developed by Alfred Bucherer and Paul Langevin, in which the electron contracts in the line of motion, and expands perpendicular to it, so that the volume remains constant. This gives:

Kaufmann's experiments
The predictions of the theories of Abraham and Lorentz were supported by the experiments of Walter Kaufmann (1901), but the experiments were not precise enough to distinguish between them. In 1905 Kaufmann conducted another series of experiments (Kaufmann–Bucherer–Neumann experiments) which confirmed Abraham's and Bucherer's predictions, but contradicted Lorentz's theory and the "fundamental assumption of Lorentz and Einstein", i.e., the relativity principle. In the following years experiments by Alfred Bucherer (1908), Gunther Neumann (1914) and others seemed to confirm Lorentz's mass formula. It was later pointed out that the Bucherer–Neumann experiments were also not precise enough to distinguish between the theories – it lasted until 1940 when the precision required was achieved to eventually prove Lorentz's formula and to refute Abraham's by these kinds of experiments. (However, other experiments of different kind already refuted Abraham's and Bucherer's formulas long before.)

Poincaré stresses and the  problem
The idea of an electromagnetic nature of matter, however, had to be given up. Abraham (1904, 1905) argued that non-electromagnetic forces were necessary to prevent Lorentz's contractile electrons from exploding. Abraham doubted whether it was possible to develop a model satisfying all of these properties.

To solve those problems, Henri Poincaré in 1905 and 1906 introduced some sort of pressure ("Poincaré stresses") of non-electromagnetic nature. So, the Poincaré stresses remove the contradiction in the derivation of the longitudinal electromagnetic mass, they prevent the electron from exploding, they remain unaltered by a Lorentz transformation (i.e. they are Lorentz invariant), and were also thought as a dynamical explanation of length contraction. However, Poincaré still assumed that only the electromagnetic energy contributes to the mass of the bodies.

As it was later noted, the problem lies in the  factor of electromagnetic rest mass – given above as  when derived from the Abraham–Lorentz equations. However, when it is derived from the electron's electrostatic energy alone, we have  where the  factor is missing.

Thus the missing  factor is restored when the mass is related to its electromagnetic energy, and it disappears when the total energy is considered.

Inertia of energy and radiation paradoxes

Radiation pressure
Another way of deriving some sort of electromagnetic mass was based on the concept of radiation pressure. These pressures or tensions in the electromagnetic field were derived by James Clerk Maxwell (1874) and Adolfo Bartoli (1876). Lorentz recognized in 1895 that those tensions also arise in his theory of the stationary aether. So if the electromagnetic field of the aether is able to set bodies in motion, the action / reaction principle demands that the aether must be set in motion by matter as well. However, Lorentz pointed out that any tension in the aether requires the mobility of the aether parts, which is not possible since in his theory the aether is immobile. (unlike contemporaries like Thomson who used fluid descriptions) This represents a violation of the reaction principle that was accepted by Lorentz consciously. He continued by saying, that one can only speak about fictitious tensions, since they are only mathematical models in his theory to ease the description of the electrodynamic interactions.

Mass of the fictitious electromagnetic fluid
In 1900 Poincaré studied the conflict between the action/reaction principle and Lorentz's theory. He tried to determine whether the center of gravity still moves with a uniform velocity when electromagnetic fields and radiation are involved. He noticed that the action/reaction principle does not hold for matter alone, but that the electromagnetic field has its own momentum (such a momentum was also derived by Thomson in 1893 in a more complicated way). Now, if the center of mass frame (COM-frame) is defined by both the mass of matter and the mass of the fictitious fluid, and if the fictitious fluid is indestructible – it is neither created or destroyed – then the motion of the center of mass frame remains uniform.

But this electromagnetic fluid is not indestructible, because it can be absorbed by matter (which according to Poincaré was the reason why he regarded the em-fluid as "fictitious" rather than "real"). Thus the COM-principle would be violated again. As it was later done by Einstein, an easy solution of this would be to assume that the mass of em-field is transferred to matter in the absorption process. But Poincaré created another solution: He assumed that there exists an immobile non-electromagnetic energy fluid at each point in space, also carrying a mass proportional to its energy. When the fictitious em-fluid is destroyed or absorbed, its electromagnetic energy and mass is not carried away by moving matter, but is transferred into the non-electromagnetic fluid and remains at exactly the same place in that fluid. (Poincaré added that one should not be too surprised by these assumptions, since they are only mathematical fictions.) In this way, the motion of the COM-frame, including matter, fictitious em-fluid, and fictitious non-em-fluid, at least theoretically remains uniform.

However, since only matter and electromagnetic energy are directly observable by experiment (not the non-em-fluid), Poincaré's resolution still violates the reaction principle and the COM-theorem, when an emission/absorption process is practically considered. This leads to a paradox when changing frames: if waves are radiated in a certain direction, the device will suffer a recoil from the momentum of the fictitious fluid. Then, Poincaré performed a Lorentz boost (to first order in ) to the frame of the moving source. He noted that energy conservation holds in both frames, but that the law of conservation of momentum is violated. This would allow perpetual motion, a notion which he abhorred. The laws of nature would have to be different in the frames of reference, and the relativity principle would not hold. Therefore, he argued that also in this case there has to be another compensating mechanism in the ether.

Poincaré came back to this topic in 1904. This time he rejected his own solution that motions in the ether can compensate the motion of matter, because any such motion is unobservable and therefore scientifically worthless. He also abandoned the concept that energy carries mass and wrote in connection to the above-mentioned recoil:

These iterative developments culminated in his 1906 publication "The End of Matter" in which he notes that when applying the methodology of using an electric or magnetic field deviations to determine charge-to-mass ratios, one finds that the apparent mass added by charge makes up all of the apparent mass, thus the "real mass is equal to zero." Thus he goes on to postulate that electrons are only holes or motion effects in the aether while the aether itself is the only thing "endowed with inertia."  

He then goes on to address the possibility that all matter might share this same quality and thereby his position changes from viewing aether as a "fictitious fluid" to suggesting it might be the only thing that actually exists in the universe, finally stating "In this system there is no actual matter, there are only holes in the aether."

Finally he repeats this exact problem of "Newton's principle" from 1904 again in 1908 publication in his section on "the principle of reaction" he notes that the actions of radiation pressure cannot be tied solely to matter in light of Fizeau's proof that the Hertz notion of total ether drag is untenable. This, he clarifies in the next section in his own explanation of Mass–energy equivalence: 

Thus Poincaré's mass of a fictitious fluid led him to, instead, later find that the mass of matter itself was "fictitious."

Einstein's own 1906 publication grants credit to Poincare for previously exploring the mass-energy equivalence and it is from these comments that it is commonly reported that Lorentz ether theory is "mathematically equivalent."

Momentum and cavity radiation
Contrary to Lorentz and Poincaré, who considered momentum as a fictitious force, he argued that it is a real physical entity, and therefore conservation of momentum is guaranteed.

In 1904, Friedrich Hasenöhrl specifically associated inertia with radiation by studying the dynamics of a moving cavity. Hasenöhrl suggested that part of the mass of a body (which he called apparent mass) can be thought of as radiation bouncing around a cavity. The apparent mass of radiation depends on the temperature (because every heated body emits radiation) and is proportional to its energy, and he first concluded that . However, in 1905 Hasenöhrl published a summary of a letter, which was written by Abraham to him. Hasenöhrl recalculated his own derivation and verified Abraham's result. He also noticed the similarity between the apparent mass and the electromagnetic mass that Poincaré would comment on in 1906. However, Hasenöhrl stated that this energy-apparent-mass relation only holds as long a body radiates, i.e. if the temperature of a body is greater than 0 K.

Modern view

Mass–energy equivalence
The idea that the principal relations between mass, energy, momentum and velocity can only be considered on the basis of dynamical interactions of matter was superseded, when Albert Einstein found out in 1905 that considerations based on the special principle of relativity require that all forms of energy (not only electromagnetic) contribute to the mass of bodies (mass–energy equivalence). By this equivalence, Poincaré's radiation paradox can be solved without using "compensating forces", because the mass of matter itself (not the non-electromagnetic aether fluid as suggested by Poincaré) is increased or diminished by the mass of electromagnetic energy in the course of the emission/absorption process. Also the idea of an electromagnetic explanation of gravitation was superseded in the course of developing general relativity.

So every theory dealing with the mass of a body must be formulated in a relativistic way from the outset. This is for example the case in the current quantum field explanation of mass of elementary particles in the framework of the Standard Model, the Higgs mechanism. Because of this, the idea that any form of mass is completely caused by interactions with electromagnetic fields, is not relevant any more.

Relativistic mass
The concepts of longitudinal and transverse mass (equivalent to those of Lorentz) were also used by Einstein in his first papers on relativity. However, in special relativity they apply to the entire mass of matter, not only to the electromagnetic part. Later it was shown by physicists like Richard Chace Tolman that expressing mass as the ratio of force and acceleration is not advantageous.

This concept is sometimes still used in modern physics textbooks, although the term 'mass' is now considered by many to refer to invariant mass, see mass in special relativity.

Self-energy 
When the special case of the electromagnetic self-energy or self-force of charged particles is discussed, also in modern texts some sort of "effective" electromagnetic mass is sometimes introduced – not as an explanation of mass per se, but in addition to the ordinary mass of bodies. Many different reformulations of the Abraham–Lorentz force have been derived – for instance, in order to deal with the -problem (see next section) and other problems that arose from this concept. Such questions are discussed in connection with renormalization, and on the basis of quantum mechanics and quantum field theory, which must be applied when the electron is considered physically point-like. At distances located in the classical domain, the classical concepts again come into play. A rigorous derivation of the electromagnetic self-force, including the contribution to the mass of the body, was published by Gralla et al. (2009).

problem 
Max von Laue in 1911 also used the Abraham–Lorentz equations of motion in his development of special relativistic dynamics, so that also in special relativity the  factor is present when the electromagnetic mass of a charged sphere is calculated. This contradicts the mass–energy equivalence formula, which requires the relation  without the  factor, or in other words, four-momentum doesn't properly transform like a four-vector when the  factor is present. Laue found a solution equivalent to Poincaré's introduction of a non-electromagnetic potential (Poincaré stresses), but Laue showed its deeper, relativistic meaning by employing and advancing Hermann Minkowski's spacetime formalism. Laue's formalism required that there are additional components and forces, which guarantee that spatially extended systems (where both electromagnetic and non-electromagnetic energies are combined) are forming a stable or "closed system" and transform as a four-vector.

Another solution was found by authors such as Enrico Fermi (1922), Paul Dirac (1938) Fritz Rohrlich (1960), or Julian Schwinger (1983), who pointed out that the electron's stability and the 4/3-problem are two different things. So every part of the system, not only "closed" systems, properly transforms as a four-vector. However, binding forces like the Poincaré stresses are still necessary to prevent the electron from exploding due to Coulomb repulsion. But on the basis of the Fermi–Rohrlich definition, this is only a dynamical problem and has nothing to do with the transformation properties any more.

Also other solutions have been proposed, for instance, Valery Morozov (2011) gave consideration to movement of an imponderable charged sphere. It turned out that a flux of nonelectromagnetic energy exists in the sphere body. The problem was solved without attraction of any additional hypotheses. In this model, sphere tensions are not connected with its mass.

See also
History of special relativity
Abraham–Lorentz force
Wheeler–Feynman absorber theory

Secondary sources ( references)

Primary sources

Special relativity
Obsolete theories in physics